Mount Hawke and Portreath was an electoral division of Cornwall in the United Kingdom which returned one member to sit on Cornwall Council between 2009 and 2021. It was abolished at the 2021 local elections, and was split between the divisions of St Agnes, Illogan and Portreath, Perranporth, and Redruth North.

Councillors

Extent
The division covered the villages of Portreath, Porthtowan and Mount Hawke as well as the hamlets of Menagissey, Cambrose and Banns. Parts of Mawla and Wheal Rose were also included, with both being split between the divisions of Mount Hawke & Portreath and Redruth North. The division was minorly affected by boundary changes at the 2013 election. From 2009 to 2013, the division covered 2134.7 hectares; from 2013 to 2021, it covered 2135.2 hectares.

Election results

2017 election

2013 election

2009 election

References

Electoral divisions of Cornwall Council